Chanduki is a Pakistani Sindhi film released in 1969. It is directed by A. Q. Pirzada, produced by S. Y. A. Group, and stars Mushtaq Changezi.

See also
 Sindhi cinema
 List of Sindhi-language films

References

Sindhi-language films
Pakistani black-and-white films
1969 films